The Bentheimer Landschaf (also known as Landrace of Bentheim) is a breed of domesticated sheep found in Germany.  This breed is a cross between German and Dutch heath sheep and a marsh sheep.  It is primarily used for landscape preservation.

Characteristics
The Bentheimer Landschaf displays white and has black around the eyes, ears and legs.  The fleece weighs  with a fiber diameter of 34 to 40 micrometres.

References

Sheep breeds originating in Germany
Sheep breeds
Animal breeds on the GEH Red List